Zemborzyn may refer to the following places in Poland:

Zemborzyn Drugi
Zemborzyn Kościelny
Zemborzyn Pierwszy
Zemborzyn-Kolonia